Donald Seton Cammell (17 January 1934 – 24 April 1996) was a Scottish painter, screenwriter, and film director. He has a cult reputation largely due to his debut film Performance, which he wrote the screenplay for and co-directed with Nicolas Roeg.

Biography

Early years 

Donald Cammell was born 17 January 1934 in the Outlook Tower on Castlehill, on the approach to  Edinburgh Castle in Scotland. He was the elder son of the poet and writer Charles Richard Cammell (who wrote a book on occultist Aleister Crowley) and Iona Macdonald. His middle name Seton came from his godfather, the Scottish naturalist Seton Gordon. He was educated at Shrewsbury House School and Westminster School.

Brought up in a bohemian atmosphere, Donald Cammell was raised in an environment he described as "filled with magicians, metaphysicians, spiritualists and demons" including Aleister Crowley.

Painting career 
Cammell was a precociously gifted painter, winning a scholarship to the Royal Academy at the age of 16. He subsequently studied in Florence with Annigoni and made his living as a society portrait painter. In 1953, one of his portraits was hailed as "society portrait of the year".

After the end of a short-lived early marriage, he moved to New York to live with model Deborah Dixon and concentrate on painting nudes.

Cinema career 
In 1961, he moved to Paris and began writing screenplays; first, a thriller called The Touchables, then a collaboration with Harry Joe Brown Jnr called Duffy. This caper movie was directed by Robert Parrish in 1968 (and featured James Fox), an artistic failure that frustrated Cammell to the point that he decided to direct. Through his friendship with Anita Pallenberg, he came into the orbit of the Rolling Stones and moved to London.

After Performance, he wrote a script called Ishtar that was to feature William Burroughs as a judge kidnapped while on holiday in Morocco. Like most of the scripts he worked on, it remained unproduced. His unwillingness to compromise his ideas alienated him from the Hollywood establishment that perceived him as an eccentric troublemaker. Several of Cammell's major frustrations involved Marlon Brando. In 1978, Brando invited Cammell to collaborate on a script called Fan Tan which Brando soon lost interest in; then he asked Cammell to adapt the script as a novel and again scuttled the project halfway through by losing interest. In 1987, Brando employed Cammell to direct a script he had written called Jericho. After eighteen months of work, while on pre-production in Mexico, Brando again decided he did not want to go through with the project.

The next project Cammell managed to get made was a short called The Argument (1971/99) that was shot on location in the Utah desert by Vilmos Zsigmond on the sly. Cammell had obtained the camera on the grounds that Zsigmond was shooting tests for another film. This confrontation between a frustrated film director and a goddess (played by Myriam Gibril, Cammell's lover and Isis to his Osiris in Lucifer Rising) covers many of Cammell’s favourite themes, but Cammell never completed the film. It was rediscovered and put together by his editor, Frank Mazzola, in 1999.

Cammell’s next feature was Demon Seed (1977). Although not a personal project, this science fiction thriller (based on a book by Dean R. Koontz) featured many of Cammell’s obsessions. A super-computer takes over a scientist’s house with his wife (Julie Christie) inside and proceeds to terrorise and ultimately impregnate her. A two-hander between Christie and the computer, Demon Seed'''s mind games and closed environment are reminiscent of Performance, while the idea of the machine giving a child to the heroine and thus providing itself with a human incarnation is another example of Cammell’s fascination with transformative sexuality.

Cammell had to wait until 1987 to complete another project, White of the Eye. This study of a serial killer features a return of his cross-cutting techniques (absent from Demon Seed).

Personal life
Cammell was married twice, first to the Greek actress Maria Andipa (m. 1954), by whom he had a son Amadis (b. 1959), and then to the American writer China Kong (m. 1978), with whom he started an affair when she was 14. He is survived by his son and his second wife.

Death

Cammell committed suicide by shotgun in 1996.

 Filmography 
 Duffy (1968)
 Performance, with Nicolas Roeg (1968; released 1970)
 Demon Seed (1977)
 White of the Eye (1987)
 The Argument (1971; released 1998)
 Wild Side (1995; director's cut released in 1999)
 Donald Cammell: The Ultimate Performance'' (1999)

References

External links 
 
 Senses of Cinema: Great Directors Critical Database
 Donald Cammell @ pHinnWeb
 Essay review of "Wild Side"
 Donald Cammell article on Scotsman.com
 

1934 births
1996 suicides
Film people from Edinburgh
People educated at Westminster School, London
Suicides by firearm in California
Scottish film directors
Artists from Edinburgh